Fórnols de Cadí or Fórnols is a hamlet located in the municipality of La Vansa i Fórnols, in Province of Lleida province, Catalonia, Spain. As of 2020, it has a population of 19.

Geography 
Fórnols de Cadí is located 167km northeast of Lleida.

References

Populated places in the Province of Lleida